Kukkuteswara Temple is a Hindu temple in Pitapuram town of Kakinada district, Andhra Pradesh, India. The temple is prominent in both Saivite and Shakta Hindu traditions. It is one of the eighteen Maha Sakthi Peethas considered the most significant pilgrimage destinations in Shaktism. The presiding deity of the temple is Lord Kukkuteswara, a form of Lord Siva as a rooster and his consort Rajarajeswari Devi.

The temple of Puruhutika Devi, one of the Maha Shakti Peethas is on the premises of Kukkuteswara Temple. Pithapuram is referred to in the Skanda Purana and in Srinatha's Bheemeswara Puranamu and also in Samudragupta's Allahabad stone pillar inscription.

Location 

Temple 
Kukuteswara Swamy is a Swayambhu with Spatika Lingam. The temple is also famous for its single-stone Nandi (Eka Sila Nandi in Telugu).

Festivals 
Maha Sivaratri, Navaratri, and Karthika Masam are the main festivals celebrated at the temple. An annual festival is celebrated at the temple for Kukkuteswara called Maghabahula Ekadasi.

References 

Hindu temples in Kakinada district
Shiva temples in Andhra Pradesh